Zabrus gibbulus is a species of ground beetle in the Iberozabrus subgenus that is endemic to Spain.

Beetles described in 1985
Beetles of Europe
Endemic fauna of Spain
Zabrus